The Calico Printers' Association Ltd was a British textile company founded in 1899, from the amalgamation of  46 textile printing companies and 13 textile merchants. The industry had prospered in the latter half of the 19th century but the fierce competition led to a decline in quality and profit margins. Most of the leading companies in the industry decided to amalgamate in order "to preserve the tradition and standing of calico printing and to produce textiles of a high standard at reasonable prices." The company at its inception accounted for over 80% of Britain’s output of printed cloth.

The Calico Printers' Association Limited was incorporated on 8 November 1899 with an issued share capital of £8,200,000, consisting of £5,000,000 share capital and £3,200,000 of debenture stock. Under the chairmanship of F. F. Grafton, the company established its first head office at 2 Charlotte Street, Manchester, before moving to more suitable premises at 56 Mosley Street. In 1912, a new head office, the magnificent St James's Buildings was completed on Oxford Street, Manchester.

Companies involved in the merger included:
 F. W. Ashton & Co, Newton Bank Works, Hyde
 Bradshaw, Hammond & Co
 James Black & Co, Dalmonach Works, Bonhill
 Thornliebank Co Ltd
 John H. Gartside & Co
 F. W. Grafton & Co
 Hayfield Printing Company Ltd
 Hewit & Wingate Ltd
 Thomas Hoyle and Sons
 Edmund Potter & Co
 Rossendale Printing Company Ltd, Loveclough
 Salis Schwabe & Co
 Strines Printing  Company Ltd
 Whalley Abbey Printing Company Ltd
 Allan Arthur, Fletcher & Co
 Bayley and Craven Ltd
 Bingswood Printing Company Ltd
 R. Dalglish, Falconer & Co
 Inglis & Wakefield Ltd
 A. R. Macgregor & Co

Later history
In 1941, polyethylene terephthalate was discovered in the research laboratories of the Calico Printers' Association. The new polymer was later developed into the synthetic textile fibre Terylene by ICI.

The Calico Printers' Association acquired the assets of the United Turkey Red Company Ltd in 1960.

In 1968, the Calico Printers' Association  merged with the English Sewing Cotton Company to form English Calico Ltd, which changed its name to Tootal Ltd in 1973.

References

External links
 Carrbrookvillage.users.btopenworld.com
 

Textile companies of the United Kingdom
Manufacturing companies based in Manchester
Manufacturing companies established in 1899
Defunct companies based in Manchester
Defunct manufacturing companies of the United Kingdom
1899 establishments in England
Manufacturing companies disestablished in 1968
1968 disestablishments in England